Banny (masculine), Bannaya (feminine), or Bannoye (neuter) is the name of several rural localities in Russia.
Banny (rural locality), a khutor in Lychaksky Selsoviet of Frolovsky District in Volgograd Oblast
Bannoye, Altai Republic, a selo in Karagayskoye Rural Settlement of Ust-Koksinsky District in the Altai Republic; 
Bannoye, Orenburg Oblast, a selo in Kolpaksky Selsoviet of Gaysky District in Orenburg Oblast
Bannoye, Sverdlovsk Oblast, a village in Kriulinsky Selsoviet of Krasnoufimsky District in Sverdlovsk Oblast
Bannoye, Tambov Oblast, a settlement in Troitskoroslyaysky Selsoviet of Tokaryovsky District in Tambov Oblast
Bannoye, Tula Oblast, a village in Lobanovsky Rural Okrug of Yefremovsky District in Tula Oblast
Bannoye, Udmurt Republic, a village in Italmasovsky Selsoviet of Zavyalovsky District in the Udmurt Republic
Bannoye, Voronezh Oblast, a selo in Berezovskoye Rural Settlement of Vorobyovsky District in Voronezh Oblast